The Kosovo offensive (Bulgarian: , German:) was an offensive launched part of the greater Serbian campaign of World War I, by German, Austro-Hungarian, and Bulgarian units under the command of Prussian Field Marshal Mackensen. It was conducted in the south west corner of Serbia, in the historic site of the medieval battle of Kosovo, where the three Serbian armies had successfully retreated, during the second half of November 1915. 

The ultimate goal of the offensive, to encircle and destroy the Serbian army in a decisive final battle, was unsuccessful after the Serbs withdrew over the snow clad Montenegrin and Albanian mountains towards the Adriatic sea coast. 
The defeat of Serbia and forced exile of its army and government marked the end of the Serbian Campaign on November 24, 1915.

Background 
On 6 October 1915, less than a year after Serbia marked the first Allied victory of World War One and humiliated its powerful neighbour, the Austro-Hungarian Third Army, the German Eleventh Army, as well as General Sarkotić’s army from Bosnia, began the fourth invasion of Serbia. The overwhelming superiority in heavy artillery, as well as the weight of numbers, quickly overwhelmed the Serbian army who started streaming southwards towards Kragujevac and Niš; Five days later, the Serbs were caught by surprise when the Bulgarian First and Second Armies invaded Serbia from the east, cutting the rail line that ran north from Salonika and depriving Serbia of reinforcements and artillery ammunition. The Serbian high command was forced to transfer its all-important Second Army from the northern front to defend this border. In spite of a tenacious defense that caused the enemy to advance slower than anticipated, the pressure of the Austro-Hungarians, the Germans, and the Bulgarian First Army in the north and the Bulgarian Second Army advancing from the east forced the Serbs to retreat in a southwesterly direction into Kosovo.

Prelude
The Serbs gradually withdrew continuing fierce resistance hoping for Allies’ aid as British and French forces had landed in Salonika. The British were reluctant to send their troops into Serbia, but a French contingent of two divisions, commanded by General Maurice Sarrail, made a tentative advance up the Vardar Valley into Serbia, after being pushed back by the Bulgarian Second Army, the French were forced to pull back towards the Greek border, three British brigades came under increasingly heavy attacks and were forced back into Greece as well. The Bulgarian forces stopped at the border. On 23 October, the Bulgarian Second Army entered Skopje and Veles on the Vardar River then started pushing northwestward to Kosovo. In doing so the Bulgarians both blocked the retreat of the Serbs to the south along the Vardar valley and cut them off from the oncoming French forces. The Serbian high command had to accept that there was no prospect of the Allies forces reaching them.

Mackensen believed that the Serbian forces still could be surrounded and destroyed, he had hoped that the Serbs would make a stand at Kragujevac, but on 31 October, it became clear that Putnik had decided to withdraw further. While determined rearguards held off the forces pressing down on him from the north, the Serbian Chief of the General Staff ordered the rest of the army to pull back towards Kosovo. Mackensen's chose to order a vigorous pursuit in the Ibar Valley, with the aim of encircling and fighting a decisive final battle against the Serbs in the Kosovo area near Priština, known as the "Field of Blackbirds".

Offensive 
On 5 November the Bulgarian 9th Infantry Division succeeded in reaching and cutting the main road running south through Niš made contact with General Gallwitz’s Eleventh German Army. On 6 November, the Forty-Third Reserve Infantry Division, commanded by Generalmajor Hermann von Runckel, moved quickly to gain control of the area south of Kraljevo which the Serb Government had abandoned two days earlier, this put the Germans in position to gain entrance to the Ibar River valley. 
Mackensen ordered an all-out pursuit by the Bulgarians southwest toward Priština, however, the Bulgarian First Army was having difficulties in getting all of its units across the West and South Morava Rivers. On 10 November the Bulgarian First Division was able to cross the South Morava at Leskovac, about 18 miles south of Niš, but a Serbian force consisting of the Timok I, Šumadija II, and Morava II Divisions were able to mount a successful counterattack driving the Bulgarians back toward Leskovac, using this respite, the Serbians continued their retreat toward Priština. On 11 November, the Bulgarian First Army's after taking Niš established contact with the German X Reserve Corps it then turned to the southwest toward Kosovo in pursuit of the retreating Serbs, for two days, the greatly outnumbered Serbian army held Prokuplje but eventually had to retreat.

The most direct pursuit of the Serbians was undertaken by the Germans with an expanded X Reserve Corps with the 107th Infantry Division attached to Prussian General Kosch's command. Kosch's route took his corps across the Jastrebac mountain, where the most direct pass was 5,200 above sea level. The passes through the mountain were few and roads often nothing more than muddy tracks. Nonetheless, Kosch's lead elements were able to seize the passes against Serbian Drina II Division on 13 November. As the weather had improved slightly in early November, reconnaissance flights were able to keep Mackensen and his commanders apprised of Serbian movements.

As the Germans and their allies advanced, the Serbians retreated. Although the loss of Niš, Kragujevac, Kruševac, and Kraljevo had cost the Serbians a tremendous quantity of equipment and had made a retreat inevitable, the Serbian army retained its organizational integrity while its rearguards managed to hold off the oncoming forces of the Central powers. The Serbian armies reached Priština and Kosovo ahead of their pursuers. The Serbians had also taken a large number of Austro-Hungarian prisoners with them, and there was also a great many civilian refugees. The Serbians had two courses open to them, namely fight or retreat, buoyed by the recent successful counterattack against the Bulgarians at Leskovac, making a final stand on the Field of Blackbirds resonated also with Serbians from a historical and national standpoint but a retreat to Prizren and from there across the mountains to the Adriatic coast where the army could rest and refit was the chosen course of action. Putnik gave the order to retreat on 22 November. 

On 23 November the Austro-Hungarian Fifty-Ninth Infantry Division reached Mitrovica. The same day the German IV Reserve Corps and the Bulgarian Ninth Division, having fended off a last Serbian counterattack toward Vranje and Kumanovo, reached the Field of Blackbirds and Priština, securing both the next day. Large numbers of prisoners and a good deal of booty were taken in both places, as well as in Novi Pazar, however, most of the Serbian Army had already withdrawn to Kosovo, managing to escape the enemy's attempts to encircle them and force them to surrender.

The ultimate prize that Mackensen and Seeckt sought, however, eluded them as Serbian forces followed by refugees had retreated to Prizren and headed toward the Adriatic coast from there. Although a pursuit to Prizren was conducted that was left largely to the Bulgarians. Conditions would simply not support the use of large forces. The IV Reserve Corps in Priština had to go on half rations. The Austro-Hungarian Tenth Mountain Brigade found its route south from Ribaric blocked by a 4,921-foot high mountain with a completely iced over track as the only way through. The brigade had already lost 30 men who had frozen to death in the harsh conditions. 

Confronted by these stark realities, Mackensen declared an end to the campaign on November 24, 1915. Berlin declared the campaign over on the 28th. All of old Serbia had been overrun, and after only three years, Kosovo was once more in the grip of an invader. 

On 25 November, the Serbian High Command issued its official order to retreat, through the mountains of Montenegro and Albania, and join the Allies to continue the war out of the country. The Serbian High Command came to the conclusion that its army was not in a favorable position and condition for a counterattack, but more importantly that capitulation was a worse choice. The last rearguard action took place at Prizren on the 27th; the defenders subsequently withdrawing down the Drin River Valley and over the Albanian frontier. Mackensen elected to not follow.

Aftermath

Following this battle and into early 1916, over 400,000 defeated and worn-out Serbian soldiers and civilian refugees, with thousands of Austrian prisoners, retreated toward the Adriatic coast on a terrible trek across Prokletije, the Accursed Mountains, that separate Serbia and Albania, as the snow began to fall. They retreated in three columns, one across southern Montenegro, one through southern Serbia across northern Albania, and the southernmost from Prizren to the port of Dürres. Ravaged by disease, freezing to death in the bitter winter, lacking food or transport, harassed all the while by Albanian guerrillas, the survivors managed somehow to stagger to the Albanian coast in what became known as the "Great Retreat."

The territory of Serbia was occupied by Austro-Hungarian and Bulgarian troops and placed under military occupation for the remainder of the war. In the Austrian zone of occupation (northern and central Serbia), a governor-general was established with a center in Belgrade. In the Bulgarian zone of occupation, a governor-general was established with a center in Niš. Kosovo was divided between the Austrians and the Bulgarians – the Bulgarian army occupied the eastern regions, while the Austro-Hungarian occupied the western regions.

According to British military historian, Peter Hart, the Central Powers had captured Serbia, but the Serbian Army would fight on regardless. It was a potent example of the difficulties attached to fighting a war against nation-states that will not accept defeat. Although the three attempts to envelop and destroy the Serbian armies had failed, the strategic objective had been obtained as Germany, Austria-Hungary, Bulgaria, and Turkey then controlled a solid swath of territory in the middle of the Eurasian landmass.

Notes

References

Citations

Sources

	

Serbia in World War I

1915 in Serbia
1915 in Bulgaria
November 1915 events
December 1915 events
Kosovo 1915
Battles involving Austria-Hungary
Kosovo 1915
Battles involving Germany
Kosovo 1915
Battles involving Serbia
Battles involving Austria
Conflicts in 1915
Kosovo in World War I